Soknedal Church is a parish church of the Church of Norway in Midtre Gauldal municipality in Trøndelag county, Norway. It is located in the village of Soknedal. It is the church for the Soknedal parish which is part of the Gauldal prosti (deanery) in the Diocese of Nidaros. The white, wooden church was built in a long church design in 1933 using plans drawn up by the architect John Egil Tverdahl. The church seats about 480 people.

History
The earliest existing historical records of the church date back to the year 1533, but the church was likely built during the 13th century. The first church in Soknedal was likely a stave church.

In 1651, a new church was built. It was consecrated on 14 December 1651. After the new church was completed, the old church was torn down.

In 1861, it was decided to build a new church when the old one was too small and the roof was also in very poor condition. A new wooden long church was consecrated in 1864. The building burned down in a fire in 1932. A new church was built the next year in 1933 on the foundations of the previous church.

Media gallery

See also
List of churches in Nidaros

References

Midtre Gauldal
Churches in Trøndelag
Long churches in Norway
Wooden churches in Norway
20th-century Church of Norway church buildings
Churches completed in 1933
13th-century establishments in Norway